The Worshipper of Larsa is a Mesopotamian statuette on display in Room 227 at the Louvre Museum, of the paleo-Babylonian era (2004-1595 BCE). It depicts a bearded man, kneeling and performing a ritual gesture with his hand to his mouth. The statuette was dedicated to the god Amurru by an inhabitant of Larsa, in order to safeguard the life of King Hammurabi (reigned c. 1792 BC-1750 BC).

Description 
The face, beard and hands of the orant were gilded with gold leaf. The character wears a hat similar to those of royal attires and is putting his hand to his mouth, a gesture of prayer. The right side of the pedestal depicts the same character in the same position in front of a deity, which a long inscription identifies as Amurru, patron god of the Amorrites. The left side features an ox. The front has a small vase used for offerings.

The statuette is exceptionally well-preserved, with a very finely depicted face. It was purchased in 1931, following archaeological excavations at Larsa.

Its Louvre inventory number is  AO 15704.

Inscription 
The pedestal bears the inscription:

Notes and references 

18th-century BC works
1931 archaeological discoveries
First Babylonian Empire
Bronze sculptures
Isin-Larsa period
Sculptures of the Louvre
Sculptures of men in France
Hammurabi